Osip Ivanovich Somov (13 June 1815, Moscow Governorate – 8 May 1876, Saint Petersburg) was a Russian mathematician.

References

External links 
 
 

1815 births
1876 deaths
Russian mathematicians
19th-century mathematicians from the Russian Empire
Full members of the Saint Petersburg Academy of Sciences